The Réseau du sport étudiant du Québec (RSEQ; literal translation: Quebec Student Sports Network) is the current name for the organisation formerly known as the Fédération du sport scolaire du Québec (FSSQ; Quebec Student Sports Federation).  RSEQ is the governing body of primary and secondary school, collegiate and university sport in Quebec. It also serves as a regional membership association for Canadian universities which assists in co-ordinating competition between their university level athletic programs and providing contact information, schedules, results, and releases about those programs and events to the public and the media.  This is similar to what would be called a "college athletic conference" in the United States.

The RSEQ, which covers Quebec, is one of four such bodies that are members of the country's governing body for university athletics, U Sports. The other three regional associations coordinating university-level sports in Canada are Ontario University Athletics (OUA), Atlantic University Sport (AUS), and the Canada West Universities Athletic Association (CW).

The RSEQ was initially known as the Association sportive universitaire du Québec (FSSQ; Quebec Universities Athletic Association) when it was founded in 1971 with the reformulations of three university athletic associations spanning the universities of Ontario and Quebec. After the merger between the university, collegiate and high school governing bodies in 1989, the amalgamated association was named to the QSSF and then renamed RSEQ in November 2010.

As with all of Canada's provincial high school athletics associations, the RSEQ is an affiliate member of the United States-based National Federation of State High School Associations (NFHS).

Member schools

U Sports member schools

Since the 2017–18 school year, Bishop's has played football in AUS, but remains a member of RSEQ in other sports.

Non-U Sports member schools
Note: The following universities below are not members of U Sports, and are solely RSEQ members and participate in certain sports.

CCAA member schools
The RSEQ also oversees college sports in Quebec, and the following are members of the Canadian Collegiate Athletic Association.

Facilities

<div style=>

(*Laval's PEPS stade extérieur has an official seated capacity of 12,257 although it has held a standing room crowd of over 18,000 and as such is often listed as having a maximum capacity of 18,000.)

(Data mined from the U Sports homepage's member directory and WorldStadiums.com.  The members directory numbers seem to be ballpark figures in some cases.)

See also

Associations
 U Sports
 Canadian Collegiate Athletic Association

Leagues
 Quebec University Football League
 Hockey collégial féminin RSEQ
 U Sports Women's Basketball
 U Sports Football
 U Sports Women's Ice Hockey
 U Sports Men's Soccer
 U Sports Women's Soccer
 U Sports Men's Volleyball
 U Sports Women's Volleyball

References

External links
 

Students
U Sports
U Sports basketball
U Sports football
U Sports volleyball
College athletics conferences in Canada
1971 establishments in Quebec
Student sports governing bodies